The Servalar Dam was set up for power generation in 1986, with a capacity of 1225 million cubic feet. The peak water level of the dam is 156 ft. The water drained out of the dam's power plant is again stored in  Papanasam Dam for  irrigation.

References

Dams in Tamil Nadu
Tirunelveli district
Dams completed in 1986
1986 establishments in Tamil Nadu
20th-century architecture in India